Chrotogonus is a genus of grasshoppers belonging to the family Pyrgomorphidae.

The species of this genus are found in Africa and Southern Asia.

Species:

Chrotogonus arenicola 
Chrotogonus armatus 
Chrotogonus brachypterus 
Chrotogonus hemipterus 
Chrotogonus homalodemus 
Chrotogonus oxypterus 
Chrotogonus senegalensis 
Chrotogonus trachypterus 
Chrotogonus tuberculatus 
Chrotogonus turanicus

References

Pyrgomorphidae
Caelifera genera